is a former Japanese football player.

Club statistics

References

External links

1976 births
Living people
Rissho University alumni
Association football people from Chiba Prefecture
Japanese footballers
J2 League players
Japan Football League (1992–1998) players
Japan Football League players
Tokushima Vortis players
Association football forwards